George R. McKay  was a rugby union player who represented Australia.

McKay, a number eight, claimed a total of 6 international rugby caps for Australia.

References

                   

Australian rugby union players
Australia international rugby union players
Rugby union number eights